The 30th General Assembly of Prince Edward Island was in session from March 29, 1887, to January 7, 1890. The majority party was the Conservative Party led by William Wilfred Sullivan. After Sullivan resigned to serve in the province's Supreme Court, Neil McLeod became party leader and premier.

There were three sessions of the 30th General Assembly:

The speaker was John A. MacDonald.

Members

Notes:

External links 
  Election results for the Prince Edward Island Legislative Assembly, 1886-06-30
 Prince Edward Island, garden province of Canada, WH Crosskill (1904)

Terms of the General Assembly of Prince Edward Island
1887 establishments in Prince Edward Island
1890 disestablishments in Prince Edward Island